Liometopum croaticum is an extinct species of Miocene ant in the genus Liometopum. Described by Heer in 1849, the fossils were found in Croatia.

References

†
Miocene insects
Prehistoric insects of Europe
Fossil taxa described in 1849
Fossil ant taxa